A Beautiful Life is a 2008 American drama film directed by Alejandro Chomski and starring Jesse Garcia and Angela Sarafyan. It was released by New Films International, adapted from the play Jersey City by Wendy Hammond. The film received a 0% score on the review aggregator site Rotten Tomatoes.

Plot
A young woman, Maggie (Angela Sarafyan), is on the run from her abusive father. David (Jesse Garcia) is an illegal immigrant working as a dishwasher while searching for his mother in Los Angeles. The two meet and fall in love.

Cast
 Angela Sarafyan as Maggie
 Jesse Garcia as David
 Bai Ling as Esther
 Meltem Cumbul as Antanas
 Debi Mazar as Susan
 Rena Owen as Sam
 Jonathan LaPaglia as Vince
 Dana Delany as Anne
 Enrique Castillo as Don Miguel
 Ronnie Gene Blevins as Henry
 Walter Perez as Enrico
 Ștefan Bănică Jr. as Jack
 Saadet Aksoy as Denise
 Andreea Marin Banica as Britney
 Tuba Ünsal as Sadenaz
 Kayla Paige as Lucy
 Deborah Calla as Virginia
 Gloria Alexandra as Stripper
 Royana Black as Cathy
 Dan Kelpine as Jim

Release
Although produced in 2008, the film was not released widely in North America until October 2, 2009, and first appeared on DVD on March 1, 2011.

This was the second film by New Films International, a long-existing global independent film distribution company based in Sherman Oaks headed by Nesim Hason, whose new American division was led by Tim Swain. The company describes its focus as "festival-driven, high-quality, cast-driven indie films".

Reception
A Beautiful Life received poor reviews from the twelve sources noted by the Rotten Tomatoes website. Metacritic gave the film a score of 13 out of 100, summarizing the reviews of the seven critics it measured as "overwhelming dislike".

The New York Times called it a "laughably clichéd dive into sexual masochism", and The Village Voice saw it as a "misery pile up ... about broken souls and crossed paths destined for the trash heap. Scream, smash, slap, cry, repeat."

Slant gave it a half-star out of four, saying that "its awfulness [comes] in so many forms that it's hard to single out just one appalling example". Variety felt that it provided "unintentional laughs by the barrel", and predicted that the film would be a box office bomb. NPR said that although the film deals with some serious topics, the random nature of characters and controversies made it hard to appreciate them, describing it as "too earnest to be a hoot, and too amateurish to be anything else".

References

External links
 

2008 films
2008 drama films
American drama films
Films directed by Alejandro Chomski
2000s English-language films
2000s American films